Odermatt is a Swiss surname. Notable people with the surname include:

 Arnold Odermatt (1925–2021), Swiss police photographer
 Joseph Odermatt, Palmarian Catholic church Pope known as Peter III 
 Karl Odermatt (born 1942), Swiss former footballer
 Urs Odermatt (born 1955), Swiss film director and author
 Marco Odermatt (born 1997), Swiss alpine ski racer

Swiss-German surnames